La Boda (Spanish "The Wedding") may refer to:

La boda (Goya), 1792 painting
La Boda (1964 film), Argentine film
La Boda (1982 film), Venezuelan film
"La Boda", single by Marisol (actress) 1967
"La Boda (Aventura song)", song by Bachata group Aventura from the album God's Project

See also
Boda (disambiguation)